Laura Van Gilder (born December 11, 1964) is an American road bicycle racer from Cresco, Pennsylvania, who currently rides for American amateur team Mellow Mushroom Racing. Van Gilder turned professional in 1992, and represented her nation at the 2002 and 2005 UCI Road World Championships.

Personal life
Van Gilder was born in Pocono Pines, Pennsylvania and attended East Stroudsburg University of Pennsylvania, earning two degrees in hospitality and hotel management.

Major results
Source:

Road

1998
 1st 89er Criterium
 1st Street Sprints & Brick Criterium, A to Z Classic
 1st Koed Calendars Criterium
 1st Skyscraper Classic
 1st Tour of Mt. Nebo
 Bermuda GP
1st Criterium
1st Circuit race
 1st Sprints classification Fitchburg Longsjo Classic
1999
 1st Tour of Somerville
 1st Stage 2 Superweek International Cycling
 2nd BMC Tour of Houston
 2nd Clarendon Cup
 8th Liberty Classic
2000
 1st  Criterium, National Road Championships
 2nd La Paz County Park Criterium
 2nd McLane-Pacific Bicycle Classic
 2nd NYC Women's Challenge
 3rd Overall USPROTOUR
2001
 1st Overall Wendy's International Cycling Classic
 2nd Criterium, National Road Championships
2002
 1st Overall USA Cycling National Racing Calendar
 1st Overall Pro Cycling Tour
 1st Overall Nature Valley Grand Prix
1st Stages 1 & 2
 1st Overall Tour du Grand Montréal
1st Stages 1 & 2
 1st Chris Thater Memorial Criterium
 1st San Rafael Criterium
 1st Tour of Somerville
 International Tour de Toona
1st Sprints classification
1st Stages 4 & 5
 2nd Liberty Classic
2003
 1st CSC Invitational
 1st Mengoni Grand Prix
 1st Stage 3 Solano Bicycle Classic
 1st Stage 5 International Tour de Toona
2004
 1st Captech Classic Richmond
 1st Stage 3 Valley of the Sun Stage Race
 1st Stage 1 Pomona Valley Stage Race
 1st Stage 4 Joe Martin Stage Race
 1st Sprints classification Redlands Bicycle Classic
 3rd Liberty Classic
2005
 1st Garrett Lemire Memorial GP
 1st Kelly Cup
 1st CSC Invitational
 1st Tour of Somerville
 1st Stage 2 Central Valley Classic
 3rd Liberty Classic
2006
 1st Chris Thater Memorial Criterium
 1st Stage 3 Nature Valley Grand Prix
 1st Stage 6 International Tour de Toona
2007
 1st Indio Grand Prix
 1st CSC Invitational
 1st Crystal Cup
 1st Garrett Lemire Memorial Grand Prix
 1st Spartanburg Criterium
 1st Sunny King Criterium
 1st Raleigh Criterium
 1st BikeJam / Kelly Cup
 1st Jacksonville Road Race
 1st Manhattan Beach Grand Prix
 1st Westchester Criterium
 1st USA Crits Finals
 1st Stage 2 Joe Martin Stage Race
 1st Stage 4 Nature Valley Grand Prix
 International Tour de Toona
1st Stages 4 & 7
 3rd Reading Classic
 6th Liberty Classic
2008
 1st International Tour de Toona
 1st Stage 1 Joe Martin Stage Race
2009
 1st San Jose Cycling Classic
 1st Bank of America Wilmington GP
 1st Stage 3 Joe Martin Stage Race
 1st Stage 1 Tulsa Tough
 1st Stage 1 Tour of Elk Grove
2010
 1st BikeJam / Kelly Cup
 1st Wilmington Grand Prix
 1st Tour de Grove
 2nd Air Force Cycling Classic Clarendon Cup
2011
 1st Stage 4 International Tour de Toona
 8th Liberty Classic
2012
 1st Overall Tour of America's Dairyland
1st Stages 1, 2 & 3
 1st Historic Roswell Criterium
 1st Glencoe Grand Prix
 1st Harlem Skyscraper Cycling Classic
 1st East Troy Cycling Classic
 1st Giro d'Grafton
 1st Waukesha Carl Zach Cycling Classic
 1st Greenbush Road Race
 1st Chris Thater Memorial
 8th Liberty Classic
2013
 1st Overall Tour of America's Dairyland
1st Stage 3
 1st Belmont Criterium
 1st East Tosa Gran Prix
 1st Stage 2 Intelligentsia Cup Prairie State Cycling Series
2015
 2nd Mildred Kugler Women's Open
 4th Overall Tour of America's Dairyland
 8th Overall Armed Forces Association Cycling Classic

Cyclo-cross

2008
 1st Fogelsville cyclo-cross
 1st Springfield Township Michigan cyclo-cross
 1st Philadelphia cyclo-cross
 1st Northampton cyclo-cross
 1st Bridgeton City Park cyclo-cross
 1st Highland Park cyclo-cross
 1st Jamesburg cyclo-cross
 1st Warwick cyclo-cross
2009
 1st Nittany Lion Cross UCI C2 – MAC SERIES Race #1
 1st Fogelsville cyclo-cross
 1st Baltimore cyclo-cross
2010
 1st Breinigsville cyclo-cross
 1st Baltimore cyclo-cross
 1st Lincoln cyclo-cross
 1st Gloucester cyclo-cross
 1st Jamesburg cyclo-cross
 1st Northampton cyclo-cross
 1st Warwick cyclo-cross
2011
 1st Providence cyclo-cross
 1st Wilmington cyclo-cross
 1st Sterling cyclo-cross
2012
 1st Warwick cyclo-cross
 1st East Meadows cyclo-cross

References

External links
Cheerwine Cycling: Biography

American female cyclists
East Stroudsburg University of Pennsylvania alumni
1964 births
Living people
21st-century American women